The Mathew Elmore Sewalt House, on E. Jefferson Avenue in Lovington, New Mexico, was listed on the National Register of Historic Places in 2006.  It was built in two phases in 1909 and 1916 and has also been known as the Sewalt House and as the Sewalt-Waits House.

It is a one-and-a-half-story adobe house with concrete stucco.  It was started by Ham Bishop as an adobe pyramidal roof house.  It was bought by "up-and-coming rancher" Mathew Sewalt in 1916, and he expanded it.  It has Craftsman details including exposed rafter ends and a low shed-roof dormer.

Unfortunately Sewalt died young, in the 1918 influenza epidemic, but he had contributed "much to Lovington's improvement, including organizing corporations that founded the town's first bank and financed its first modem hotel."  The house is significant as one of the better examples of a town home in Lovington "and reflects the shortlived prosperity of the town and the rancher who owned it."

References

Houses on the National Register of Historic Places in New Mexico
Houses completed in 1916
Lea County, New Mexico
New Mexico State Register of Cultural Properties